Camaquã is a municipality in the state of Rio Grande do Sul, Brazil.

The municipality contains part of the  Camaquã State Park, which was created in 1975.

See also

 List of municipalities in Rio Grande do Sul

References

Municipalities in Rio Grande do Sul